Kummakivi is a large balancing rock in Ruokolahti, Finland.

The length of Kummakivi is about 23 feet (or 7 meters). It is supported by the minute, precipitously sloping imprint of a smaller rock outcrop that rises from the ground of the forest. The rock in question looks to be on the verge of falling off its ledge, yet it is impossible to move it, at least not with the strength of human muscles. The explanation for this isn't as odd as it would first appear: Kummakivi is big, yet things that are big don't always have a greater chance of being impacted by gravity than those that are little. The texture of Kummakivi is rather rough, which contributes to its ability to remain in place, and the material's density varies over its surface. If you examine the rock that is balancing on its edge with your eyes, you could get the impression that the center of gravity is wrong, but in reality, the rock is acting precisely as predicted by physical laws.

Kummakivi has been protected since 1962. A pine tree originating from the 1980s grows on top of the boulder.

The boulder is located in a forest in the western part of the Ruokolahti municipality, near the border of Puumala.

It is well worth one's time to make the journey to Kummakivi. Its coordinates are N=6818585.328, E=576101.029.

References

Rock formations of Europe
Landforms of Finland